Gidon Bromberg (born November 26, 1963) is the Israeli director of EcoPeace Middle East (formerly Friends of the Earth Middle East). EcoPeace is a regional organization that brings together Jordanian, Palestinian and Israeli environmentalists to promote sustainable development and advance peace efforts in the Middle East. It has offices in Amman, Bethlehem and Tel Aviv, employs 40 paid staff and actively involves hundreds of volunteers.

Bromberg founded the organization under the name of EcoPeace in 1994 and has been the Israeli director ever since. In 1997, he led the entry of the organization into Friends of the Earth International, the largest grassroots environmental organization in the world. He has spearheaded the organization's advocacy campaigns both in Israel and internationally. He developed its particularly notable cross-border community peace-building project "Good Water Neighbors", which is now seen as a model for other programs in conflict areas.

Bromberg speaks regularly on water, peace and security issues in various forums. He has presented before the UN Commission for Sustainable Development, the United States House Committee on Foreign Affairs, the European Parliament and the advisory meeting to the UN High Level Panel on Security. He is a member of the Israeli Inter-Ministerial Committee on the Future of the Dead Sea, of the Israel UNESCO World Heritage Committee and the Inter-Ministerial Committee for Sustainable Development in Israel. In 2007, Mr. Bromberg was invited to join the EastWest Institute's International Task Force for Preventive Diplomacy. Most recently, he was selected for the 2007 World Fellowship at Yale University on global leadership.

Bromberg is an attorney by profession and previously worked in public interest environmental law. He is a member of the Israel Bar Association. He holds a Bachelor of Economics and a law degree from Monash University in Australia. As a fellow of the New Israel Fund, he completed a master's degree in international environmental law at the American University in Washington, D.C. He has published over twenty academic and popular publications concerning Middle East environmental policy and water security issues.

Awards
EcoPeace's three co-directors at the time - Gidon Bromberg (Israel), Munqeth Mehyar (Jordan) and Nader Al-Khateeb (Palestine) - were honored by Time magazine as Heroes of the Environment (2008) and the organization was granted the prestigious Skoll Award in 2009. EcoPeace also received a 2008 SEED Finalist Award.

Published works

Op-eds: principal author
"Let common sense flow". Haaretz online. October 12, 2008.
"Will it save the Dead Sea?" bitterlemons-international.org: Middle East Roundtable. June 24, 2005.

EcoPeace Middle East Reports: co-author
Environmental Peacebuilding Theory and Practice
Identifying Common Environmental Problems and Shared Solutions
Good Water Neighbors
Municipal Cooperation across Conflict Divides - A Preliminary Study
Nature, Agriculture and the Price of Water in Israel
Economic Valuation of Resuscitating the Dead Sea
Advancing Conservation and Sustainable Development of the Dead Sea Basin - Broadening the Debate on Economic and Management Issues
Let the Dead Sea Live
Dead Sea Challenges
One Basin - One Strategy
Jordan River Peace Park Pre Feasibility Study
How Past Trans-boundary Security Arrangements Can Change the Future of Peace Parks in the Tri-partite Region
FoEME Report on the Proposed Red Dead Conduit
Red Sea-Dead Sea Conduit - Geo-Environmental Study Along the Arava Valley
A Seeping Time Bomb: Pollution of the Mountain Aquifer by Solid Waste

For more, see Publications tab on EcoPeace Middle East website

References

External links
 EcoPeace Middle East website 
 Biographical article - Topsfield, J., 12 April 2008. "Eco-Warrior for peace". The Age.
 Treehugger interview with Gidon Bromberg - part one and part two

Video
 Gidon Bromberg on the Jordan River Peace Park
 Gidon Bromberg - Peace through environmental activism
 Gidon Bromberg on the Good Water Neighbors Project
 Good Water Neighbors and youth - "Green Mideast Peace"
 EcoPeace Middle East Eco-Park in the Zeiglab Basin, Jordan Valley

Israeli lawyers
Monash University alumni
American University alumni
1963 births
Living people
Israeli environmentalists